Unilog Content Solutions (or simply, Unilog) is a global technology company specializing in eCommerce and product data management in the B2B marketplace. Their flagship product is CIMM2, a software platform designed to facilitate commerce and communication between businesses. The company is headquartered in Bangalore, India with North American headquarters near Philadelphia, Pennsylvania. In 2015 and 2016, Unilog was named one of the "50 Fastest Growing Tech Companies" by The Silicon Review and has been positioned in the Magic Quadrant for Digital Commerce by Gartner since 2016.

History
Unilog was founded in 1998 by Achutha Bachalli and Vatsal Poddar in Bangalore. The company was originally known as Srisoft and offered low-end Business-to-Business services like data entry and cataloging. Companies often outsourced engineering work to Unilog in its early days. In 2001, Unilog's employee base dipped from 100 to 15 as a result of the dot-com bust. In 2004, Suchit Bachalli (the founder's son) joined the company. Also in 2004, Unilog earned its first major client in Fisher Scientific, a United Statesbased biotechnology company.

In 2007, Unilog opened a research and development facility in Mysore where it now employs close to 600+ engineers. Two years later, the company began looking into potential product offerings rather than services. In 2011, the business opened its North American headquarters in the Philadelphia suburb of Wayne, Pennsylvania. They also launched their B2B eCommerce software, CIMM2, that year. One of the first clients to purchase and operate the CIMM2 software was SupplyForce. By 2015, the customer base in the United States had grown to around 100.

In January 2015, it was announced that Unilog had been selected by the state of Pennsylvania to take part in the Keystone Innovation Zone tax credit program. In September 2015, the company received an undisclosed amount of investor backing from Kalaari Capital. A month later, in October 2015, Affiliated Distributors (AD) announced that it would be deploying Unilog's CIMM2 software to manage its eCommerce offerings for its distributors.

In April 2017, Suchit Bachalli was appointed Chief Executive Officer of Unilog and its global subsidiaries, succeeding his father, Achutha.

The following year, Unilog began its partnership with independent hardlines distributor Orgill to make their eCommerce platform and product content subscription services available to Orgill’s more than 6,000 hardware, home improvement, and building material retailers.

Products
Unilog's flagship product is the CIMM2 software system. It is an eCommerce platform specifically designed for businesses who sell to other businesses. It includes numerous features including a product information management (PIM) tool, product content management, an eCommerce shopping cart, multiple search and navigation tools, data analytics capabilities, and other features designed specifically to meet the needs of the wholesale distribution marketplace.

The company continues to build and evolve its product and service offerings and, in November 2019, announced the launch of its next-generation digital commerce platform, Unilog CX1™. The first module in the platform to be released, the CX1 PIM, was initially made available to AD members to give them the ability to manage product data and content for very large, complex catalogs.

Recognition and awards
In 2015 and 2016, Unilog was named one of the "50 Fastest Growing Tech Companies" in the United States by The Silicon Review. Also in 2015, the Philadelphia Business Journal listed Unilog's North American President, Suchit Bachalli, among their 2015 "40 Under 40" list.

Unilog has been positioned in Gartner’s annual "Magic Quadrant for Digital Commerce" since 2016 and was cited in "The Forrester Wave™: B2B Commerce Suites, Q3 2018," evaluation. Most recently, Unilog’s software platform was selected as one of the top winners in The Software Report’s "The 25 Best Ecommerce Software of 2020".

References

External links
Official Website

Technology companies established in 1998
Companies based in Bangalore
1988  establishments in Karnataka
Indian companies established in 1988